Ana Botafogo (born 9 July 1957) is a Brazilian ballet dancer and actress.

Born in Rio de Janeiro, she started her studies in her hometown and to dance professionally in France, at the Ballet de Marseille. Botafogo also attended the Salle Pleyel's Goubé Academy at Paris, École supérieure de danse de Cannes Rosella Hightower, and Dance Center-Covent Garden, in London.

Botafogo has been the prima ballerina of Theatro Municipal do Rio de Janeiro since 1981.

She debuted in the Municipal with the ballet Coppélia, which opened her career to international presentations. She made a special participation as an actress in the TV Globo telenovela Páginas da Vida, playing the ballet teacher Elisa, daughter of the characters played by Tarcísio Meira and Glória Menezes.

Filmography

Television 
 2015 – Malhação .... as herself
 2009 – Viver a Vida .... as herself
 2006 – Páginas da Vida .... Elisa Fragoso Martins de Andrade Telles
 1996 – Não Fuja da Raia ... Andrea

References

External links 
 
 

Actors from Rio de Janeiro (state)
1957 births
Brazilian ballerinas
Living people